Emil i Lönneberga is a 1971 Swedish film, the first of three films based on the Emil i Lönneberga books written by Astrid Lindgren.

Cast

External links 
 
 

Swedish children's films
1970s Swedish-language films
1971 films
Films based on Emil of Lönneberga
Films directed by Olle Hellbom
Films set in Småland
1970s Swedish films